James Brande or Brende (by 1532 – 1582 or later), was an English politician.

He was a Member (MP) of the Parliament of England for Old Sarum in March 1553 and for Southampton in April 1554, November 1554, 1555, 1558 and 1563.

References

Year of death missing
Year of birth uncertain
English MPs 1553 (Edward VI)
English MPs 1554
English MPs 1554–1555
English MPs 1555
English MPs 1558
English MPs 1563–1567